Methandriol (brand names Anabol, Crestabolic, Cytobolin, Diandren, Durabolic, Madiol, Mestenediol, Methabolic, Methydiol, Sterabolic, Stenediol), also known as methylandrostenediol, is an androgen and anabolic steroid (AAS) medication which was developed by Organon and is used in both oral and injectable (as methandriol dipropionate, methandriol propionate, or methandriol bisenanthoyl acetate) formulations. It is an orally active 17α-alkylated AAS and a derivative of the endogenous androgen prohormone androstenediol.

Medical uses
Methandriol has been used in the treatment of breast cancer in women. It has been reported to be almost as virilizing as comparable doses of testosterone propionate and methyltestosterone in women.

Available forms
Methandriol (brand name Androteston M, Notandron, Protandren) was previously marketed as 25 mL and 50 mg/mL aqueous suspensions for use by intramuscular injection.

Chemistry

Methandriol, also known as 17α-methyl-5-androstenediol or as 17α-methylandrost-5-ene-3β,17β-diol, is a synthetic androstane steroid and a 17α-alkylated derivative of 5-androstenediol (androst-5-ene-3β,17β-diol). A number of esters of methandriol exist, including methandriol dipropionate (methylandrostenediol 3β,17β-dipropionate), methandriol propionate (methylandrostenediol 3β-propionate), methandriol bisenanthoyl acetate (methylandrostenediol 3β,17β-dioxononanoate), and methandriol diacetate (methylandrostenediol 3β,17β-diacetate; never marketed). Methandriol is closely related to methyltestosterone (17α-methyltestosterone or 17α-methylandrost-4-ene-17β-ol-3-one).

An analogue of methandriol is its positional isomer methyl-4-androstenediol (17α-methylandrost-4-ene-3β,17β-diol). Another analogue of methandriol is ethynylandrostanediol (17α-ethynyl-5α-androstane-3β,17β-diol) as well as its ester ethandrostate (ethynylandrostanediol 3β-cyclohexylpropionate).

History
Methandriol was first synthesized in 1935 along with methyltestosterone and mestanolone.

Society and culture

Generic names
Methandriol is the generic name of methylandrostenediol and its .

Availability
Methandriol remains marketed for clinical use only in Taiwan and for veterinary use (as methandriol dipropionate) only in Australia.

References

External links
 Methandriol (methandriol, methandriol dipropionate) - William Llewellyn's Anabolic.org

Abandoned drugs
Androgens and anabolic steroids
Androstanes
Diols
Hepatotoxins
World Anti-Doping Agency prohibited substances